White Park, County Antrim (likely from Irish An Pháirc) is a townland of 170 acres in County Antrim, Northern Ireland. It is situated in the civil parish of Ballintoy and the historic barony of Cary.

The townland includes the beach area of White Park Bay, where a cairn is designated as a Scheduled Historic Monument at grid ref: D0225 4403.

See also 
List of townlands in County Antrim
List of places in County Antrim

References

Townlands of County Antrim
Civil parish of Ballintoy